Sanamacha Thingbaijam Chanu (born 1 February 1975) is an Indian weightlifter who competed in the women's 53 kg weight class at the 2004 Summer Olympics.
She had also won three golds at the 2002 Commonwealth Games in Manchester and was a part of the core team for the 2010 Commonwealth Games at New Delhi, during the trials for which, she was tested positive for methylhexanamine; a stimulant commonly used as a nasal decongestant.

Major results

See also
List of sportspeople sanctioned for doping offences

References
Yahoo! Sports

External links

1978 births
Living people
Indian female weightlifters
Weightlifters at the 2000 Summer Olympics
Weightlifters at the 2004 Summer Olympics
Olympic weightlifters of India
Doping cases in weightlifting
Indian sportspeople in doping cases
Recipients of the Arjuna Award
Weightlifters at the 2002 Asian Games
Weightlifters at the 1998 Asian Games
Commonwealth Games medallists in weightlifting
Commonwealth Games gold medallists for India
21st-century Indian women
21st-century Indian people
Weightlifters at the 2002 Commonwealth Games
Asian Games competitors for India
Medallists at the 2002 Commonwealth Games